Red Cliff or Chibi is a 2008–2009 internationally co-produced epic war film, based on the Battle of Red Cliffs (208–209 AD) and the events at the end of the Han dynasty and immediately prior to the Three Kingdoms period in Imperial China. The film was directed by John Woo, and stars Tony Leung, Takeshi Kaneshiro, Zhang Fengyi, Chang Chen, Zhao Wei, Hu Jun, and Lin Chi-ling. It is Woo's first major film since 2003's Paycheck and his first Chinese-language feature since 1992's Hard Boiled, also starring Leung.

In China and much of Asia, Red Cliff was released in two parts, totaling over four hours in length (288 minutes). The first part (146 minutes) premiered in Beijing on 2 July 2008 and the second (142 minutes) was released in China on 7 January 2009. Outside Asia, a cut-down single 148 minute version was released in 2009. However, the full-length two-part version was released on DVD and Blu-ray in the United Kingdom on 5 October 2009, and in the United States and Canada on 23 March 2010.

The first part of the film grossed over US$127 million internationally, and broke the Chinese box office record previously held by Titanic in mainland China.

Plot
Director John Woo said in an interview with David Stratton that the film is only 50% factual. Woo decided to alter the story using modern feelings and his own feelings for a more worldly acceptance. According to Woo, historical accuracy was less important than how the audience felt about the battle.

Part I
In the summer of 208 A.D., towards the end of the Eastern Han dynasty, the Chancellor, Cao Cao, leads the imperial army on a campaign to eliminate the southern warlords Sun Quan and Liu Bei, whom he denounces as "rebels". Emperor Xian reluctantly approves the campaign. Cao Cao's mighty army swiftly conquers Jing Province. The Battle of Changban is ignited when Cao Cao's cavalry starts attacking civilians on an exodus led by Liu Bei. During the battle, Liu Bei's followers, including his sworn brothers Guan Yu and Zhang Fei, give an excellent display of their combat skills by holding off the enemy while buying time for the civilians to retreat. The warrior Zhao Yun fights bravely to rescue Liu Bei's entrapped family but only succeeds in rescuing Liu's infant son.

Following the battle, Liu Bei's advisor, Zhuge Liang, goes on a diplomatic mission to Jiangdong to form an alliance between his lord and Sun Quan against Cao Cao. Sun Quan was initially in the midst of a dilemma of whether to surrender or fight back, but his decision to resist Cao Cao hardens after Zhuge Liang's clever persuasion and a subsequent tiger hunt with his viceroy Zhou Yu and his sister Sun Shangxiang. Meanwhile, Cai Mao and Zhang Yun, two naval commanders from Jing Province, pledge allegiance to Cao Cao, who puts them in command of his navy.

After the hasty formation of the Sun–Liu alliance, the forces of Liu Bei and Sun Quan call for a meeting to formulate a plan to counter Cao Cao's army, which is rapidly advancing towards their base at Red Cliff from both land and water. The battle begins with Sun Shangxiang leading some riders to lure Cao Cao's vanguard force into the allies' Bagua Formation. The vanguard force is defeated by the allies but Cao Cao shows no disappointment and proceeds to lead his main army to the riverbank directly opposite Red Cliff, where they make camp. While the allies throw a banquet to celebrate their victory, Zhuge Liang conceives a plan to send Sun Shangxiang on an espionage mission to Cao Cao's camp. They maintain contact by sending messages via a pigeon. The film ends with Zhou Yu lighting his miniaturised battleships on a map based on the battle formation.

Part II
Sun Shangxiang has infiltrated Cao Cao's camp and is secretly noting its details and sending them via a pigeon to Zhuge Liang. Meanwhile, Cao Cao's army is seized with a plague of typhoid fever that kills a number of his troops. Cao Cao orders the corpses to be sent on floating rafts to the allies' camp, in the hope of spreading the plague to his enemies. The allied army's morale is affected when some unsuspecting soldiers let the plague in. Eventually, a disheartened Liu Bei leaves with his forces while Zhuge Liang stays behind to assist Sun Quan. Cao Cao is overjoyed when he hears that the alliance has collapsed. At the same time, Cai Mao and Zhang Yun propose a new tactic of interlocking the battleships with iron beams to minimise rocking when sailing on the river and reduce the chances of the troops falling seasick.

Zhou Yu and Zhuge Liang make plans to eliminate Cai Mao and Zhang Yun and produce 100,000 arrows respectively. They agreed that whoever fails to complete his mission shall be executed under military law. Zhuge Liang's strategy of letting the enemy shoot 20 boats covered in straw brings in over 100,000 arrows from the enemy and makes Cao Cao doubt the loyalty of Cai Mao and Zhang Yun. On the other hand, Cao Cao sends Jiang Gan to persuade Zhou Yu to surrender, but Zhou tricks Jiang Gan into believing that Cai Mao and Zhang Yun are planning to assassinate Cao Cao. Both Zhuge Liang and Zhou Yu's respective plans complement each other when Cao Cao is convinced, despite having earlier doubts about Jiang Gan's report, that Cai Mao and Zhang Yun were indeed planning to assassinate him by deliberately "donating" arrows to the enemy. Cai Mao and Zhang Yun are executed only for Cao Cao to realize his folly afterwards.

Sun Shangxiang returns to base from Cao Cao's camp with a map of the enemy formation. Zhou Yu and Zhuge Liang decide to attack Cao Cao's navy with fire after predicting that a special climatic condition will soon cause the winds to blow from the southeast – a direction to their advantage. Before the battle, Sun Quan's forces feast on rice dumplings to celebrate the Winter Solstice. Meanwhile, Zhou Yu's wife, Xiaoqiao, after over hearing the battle plan heads towards Cao Cao's camp alone secretly in the hope of persuading Cao to give up his ambitious plans. She fails to convince Cao Cao and decides to distract him with an elaborate tea ceremony to buy time for her side.

The battle begins when the southeast wind starts blowing in the middle of the night. Sun Quan's forces launch their attack on Cao Cao's navy by ramming smaller boats that are set aflame into Cao's larger battleships. On the other hand, Liu Bei's forces, whose departure from the alliance was a ruse, start attacking Cao Cao's forts on land. By dawn, Cao Cao's entire navy has been destroyed. The allies launch another offensive on Cao Cao's ground army in his forts and succeed in breaking through using testudo formation despite suffering heavy casualties. Although Cao Cao is besieged in his main camp, he manages to hold Zhou Yu at sword point after ambushing him with the help of Cao Hong. Xiahou Jun also shows up with Xiaoqiao as a hostage and threatens to kill her if the allies do not surrender. Just then, Zhao Yun manages to reverse the situation by rescuing Xiaoqiao with a surprise attack, while Sun Quan fires an arrow that grazes the top of Cao Cao's head and cuts his topknot loose. Cao Cao is now at the mercy of the allies, but they spare his life and leave. In the final scene, Zhou Yu and Zhuge Liang have a final conversation before Zhuge walks away into the far distance with the newborn foal Mengmeng.

Abridged version
For the non-Asian releases, the film was shortened from 288 minutes to 148 minutes and was released in some countries under the title Battle of Red Cliff. An opening narration in American English provides the historical background, whereas in the Asian release, a more brief description of the context of the political situation appears in scrolling form ten minutes into the film. Notable cuts include the background and motivations behind Zhuge Liang's plan to obtain 100,000 arrows, including the threat to his life, and the early parts of Sun Shangxiang's infiltration, where she befriended a northern soldier Sun Shucai (though the scene where she mourns Sun's death was not cut). The tiger hunting scene was also cut from the non-Asian releases.

The original two-part 288 minute English version was released as a two-disc set on DVD and Blu-ray in the United Kingdom on 5 October 2009, and in the United States and Canada on 23 March 2010.

Cast

 Tony Leung as Zhou Yu
 Takeshi Kaneshiro as Zhuge Liang
 Zhang Fengyi as Cao Cao
 Chang Chen as Sun Quan
 Zhao Wei as Sun Shangxiang
 Hu Jun as Zhao Yun
 You Yong as Liu Bei
 Lin Chi-ling as Xiao Qiao
 Shidō Nakamura as Gan Xing - Probably based on the Historical Gan Ning
 Hou Yong as Lu Su
 Tong Dawei as Sun Shucai
 Batdorj-in Baasanjab as Guan Yu
 Zang Jinsheng as Zhang Fei
 Song Jia as Lady Li
 Zhang Shan as Huang Gai
 Wang Hui as Cao Hong
 Xie Gang as Hua Tuo
 Shi Xiaohong as Jiang Gan
 Xu Fengnian as Zhang Liao
 Guo Chao as Yue Jin
 Hu Xiaoguang as Xiahou Jun - Probably based on the Historical Characters Xiahou Yuan and/or Xiahou Dun
 Cui Yugui as Xu Chu
 Jiang Tong as Li Tong
 Ma Jing as Wei Ben
 Yizhen as Cai Mao
 Jia Hongwei as Zhang Yun
 Zhao Chengshun as Xun You
 Wang Zaolai as Cheng Yu
 Wang Ning as Emperor Xian of Han
 Wang Qingxiang as Kong Rong
 Li Hong as Lady Gan
 He Yin as Lady Mi
 Wang Yuzhang as Cheng Pu
 Menghe Wuliji as Guan Ping
 Sun Xinyu as Cowherd boy
 Ma Jingwu as Old fisherman
 Ye Hua as Tiantian
 Chen Changhai as Qin Song
 Zhang Yi as Zhang Zhao
 Wu Qi as Gu Yong
 He Feng as Man Tun
 Li Hongchen as Sick soldier

Production

Conception 
In a 1994 interview with Transpacific magazine, Woo stated that his dream was to direct a version of Romance of the Three Kingdoms, citing his goal of wanting to bring Chinese people together and diminish political infighting.

Casting
Ken Watanabe was originally selected for the role of Cao Cao. According to a report, some Chinese fans voiced objections over the choice as they felt that it was inappropriate for a Japanese actor to portray an important Chinese historical figure. The report claimed that the protests influenced the decision of director John Woo, who eventually chose Zhang Fengyi for the role.

Chow Yun-fat was originally selected for the role of Zhou Yu, and had even earlier been considered for the role of Liu Bei. However, he pulled out on 13 April 2007, just as shooting began. Chow explained that he received a revised script a week earlier and was not given sufficient time to prepare, but producer Terence Chang disputed this, saying that he could not work with Chow because the film's Hollywood insurer opposed 73 clauses in Chow's contract. After just 2 days, Chow was replaced by Tony Leung, who had previously turned down the role of Zhuge Liang. Although he was exhausted after filming Lust, Caution; Leung offered to help because of his 20-year friendship with Woo.

Filming
Principal photography commenced in mid-April 2007. Shooting was held at a film studio in Beijing, as well as in Hebei province, where naval warfare was staged at two working reservoirs.

On 9 June 2008, a stuntman was killed in a freak fire accident that also left six others injured.

The digital visual effects in Red Cliff II were produced by Modus FX, The Orphanage, Frantic Films, Red FX and Prime Focus.

Woo said that this film differed from other films based on The Romance of the Three Kingdoms, including story-based dramas and Three Kingdoms: Resurrection of the Dragon, because it "brings out more humane stories tangled with the characters' psychology and life events."

Release
Production is helmed by Lion Rock Entertainment and China Film Group Corporation. Distributors were fast to clinch the deal before shooting even began. Distributors include Chengtian Entertainment (China), CMC Entertainment / 20th Century Fox Taiwan Branch (Taiwan), Mei Ah Entertainment (Hong Kong), Avex Group/Toho-Towa Co. (Japan), Showbox (South Korea), the Los Angeles-based Summit Entertainment (international), and Magnolia Pictures (United States).

Home media 
The full-length two-part version was released on DVD and Blu-ray in the United Kingdom on 5 October 2009, and in the United States and Canada on 23 March 2010.

In the United Kingdom, it was 2012's fifth most-watched foreign-language film on television with 280,000 viewers on Channel 4, and the year's most-watched Asian film (above the Indian film My Name is Khan).

Critical reception
Western critics also reacted positively to the film when the two parts were released as one film (148 minute version) in June 2009. On review aggregator website Rotten Tomatoes, the film has an 91% "fresh" rating based on 116 reviews, with an average rating of 7.2/10. The site's consensus states: "Featuring some impressively grand battlefield action, John Woo returns to Asia and returns to form in the process for this lavish and slick historical epic." Metacritic reports a 73 out of 100 rating based on 22 critics, indicating "generally favorable reviews".

First part
During the first part of the film's Asia release, Variety reported that the film enjoyed a tremendous start to its theatrical run across East Asia since its release date on 10 July 2008. The film scored a record-breaking opening weekend across six Asian territories. Variety also reported that the film received a generally positive critical reception in Hong Kong, China. In South Korea, the opening day of Red Cliff knocked Hancock down to 79,000 admissions Thursday, or an estimated gross of $550,000. The film also drew more than 1.6 million viewers in South Korea – about 130,000 more than the Batman sequel The Dark Knight. At a budget of US$80 million, along with media scrutiny over its lengthy and troubled shoot, including the death of a stunt man and the hospitalisation of its producer, the film was thought by many a big financial gamble, but industry insiders reported that good word-of-mouth and positive reviews appeared to be paying off for the film's strong box-office revenue.

The Associated Press (AP) gave the film a glowing review, writing, "John Woo displays the crucial distinction in the magnificently told Red Cliff, the Hong Kong director's triumphant return to Chinese film after 16 years in Hollywood" and "with Red Cliff, Woo shows he's still a masterful director to be reckoned with."

The Hollywood Reporter also gave the film a positive review, writing, "A formidable prelude to an epic battle with resplendent effects and action spectacles."

Variety also gave the film a favourable review, and describes Red Cliff: "balances character, grit, spectacle and visceral action in a meaty, dramatically satisfying pie that delivers on the hype and will surprise many who felt Woo progressively lost his mojo during his long years stateside." The review also states that the picture may however disappoint those simply looking for a costume retread of his kinetic 80s action films, such as Heroes Shed No Tears and A Better Tomorrow.

The Korea Times writes: "Finally, Asian cinema sees the birth of a movie with the grandeur – in both budget and inspiration – of epic franchises like The Lord of the Rings." "Hefty action sequences are knit together with delightful detail, including poetic animal imagery. While the Asian-ness of movies like Crouching Tiger, Hidden Dragon caters to a Western audience, Red Cliff captures the heart and soul of the Asian philosophy with a more universal appeal." One of South Korea's main English-language newspapers JoongAng Daily raves about the film by stating "the historical China film lived up to its expectations in more ways than one."

The Japan Times gave the film a high praise and states "Red Cliff brings all that and more to the screen – a whopping two and a half hours of frenzied action, feverish passion and elegantly choreographed battle scenes ..." and listed the film at the end of the year as one of the best international (non-Japanese) films of 2008.

The Malaysian national newspaper New Straits Times also gave the film an enthusiastic review, and states: "The first film is breathtaking in its grandeur, with awe-inspiring battle scenes." The review also praised the film's 'impressive' cinematography and noted that "the characters are all well fleshed-out, complete with individual quirks and mannerisms." Vietnamese newspaper Thanh Nien Daily remarked: "Red Cliffs action is epic. Drawing from actual battle tactics from 1,800 years ago, Woo proves that after all these years he still has the ability to make the action fresh and one-of-a-kind by blending grace with violence in a whole new genre. Lovers of Asian cinema can rejoice, John Woo is back."

Second part
The second half of the film was released in China on 7 January 2009. The Hollywood Reporter writes: "It is director John Woo's level-headed ordering of narrative sequence, his skill in devising kinetic live-action to off-set technical ostentation and his vision of how to turn epic into entertainment that propels "Red Cliff II" to a thundering climax," and "colossal production turns history into legend by splashing out on spectacle and entertainment."

Variety describes the film as "Delivers in spades ... with characters already established, this half is expectedly heavier on action ... though still pack beaucoup human interest prior to the final hour's barnstorming battle," and states the film overall as "in this 280 minute, two-part version, helmer-producer Woo and fellow producer Terence Chang have indeed crafted one of the great Chinese costume epics of all time." The Japan Times gave the second part four-and-a-half stars out of five, stating that the "visually stunning Chinese historical epic ratchets the entertainment factor up to eleven."

Awards and nominations
Part I

Part II

See also

 Just Another Pandora's Box, a 2010 Hong Kong film, considered a spoof of Red Cliff
 Three Kingdoms: Resurrection of the Dragon, a 2008 film based on the Three Kingdoms
 Stunts that have gone wrong
 List of historical drama films of Asia
 List of media adaptations of Romance of the Three Kingdoms
 Records of Three Kingdoms, a historical record of the events during the Three Kingdoms period, on which the film is based
 Romance of the Three Kingdoms, one of the Four Great Classical Novels, a romanticised interpretation of the historical events during the Three Kingdoms period
 Battle of Red Cliffs, the historical battle on which the film is based
 History of the Han Dynasty, for further information about the time period

References

External links
  (US)
 
 
 
 
 
 
 Asia Society, 12 October 2009: Director John Woo: 'I Feel Like A General!'

2008 films
2009 films
2000s war films
Chinese epic films
Chinese war films
Hong Kong epic films
Hong Kong New Wave films
Hong Kong war films
Japanese epic films
Japanese war films
South Korean epic films
South Korean war films
Taiwanese epic films
Taiwanese war films
American epic films
American war films
Films directed by John Woo
Films set in 3rd-century Han dynasty
Films shot in Beijing
Films shot in China
Films shot in Taiwan
War films based on actual events
Films based on Romance of the Three Kingdoms
Showbox films
Summit Entertainment films
Magnet Releasing films
20th Century Fox films
China Film Group Corporation films
Films with screenplays by Kuo Cheng
Films scored by Taro Iwashiro
War epic films
Films released in separate parts
2000s Chinese films
2000s Hong Kong films
2000s Japanese films
2000s South Korean films
2000s American films